Batroumine (or Beitroumine  ) is a small Greek Orthodox village located in north Lebanon. The village is known too for Olives, Oil, Soap, Grapes, Wine, Arak, Figs and Blueberries production.

Location of Batroumine 
Batroumine is a Lebanese Village Located in the northern part of the country. It's located in the hilly El-Koura county south east of Tripoli and lies at an altitude of 324 meters from sea level.

Although Batroumine is located over hills, it would only take 10 minutes to reach the seashore.

Batroumine is a Lebanese village with a long history. This history is seen through the fine examples of traditional Lebanese houses located in the village center. Observation of the preserved architecture shows that the village has roots in the Byzantine period, such roots are strongly noted in the architecture of the church in the village center.

One of the important sites in Batroumine is the "Ain Al-Zarka"; it is an ancient water spring, very famous in Batroumine and its location became a natural attraction nowadays.

History of Batroumine 

Historian and language experts, Anis Frayha; wrote in his book A Dictionary of the Names of Towns and Villages in Lebanon that Batroumine could mean the House of the Nobles, or the Roman Base.

Old men and women in Batroumine told many stories about the origins of this village, which emphasize the explanation Anis Frayha gave. 
Frayha said that the word "Batroumine" is Syriac and not Arabic, but the inhabitants of Batroumine claim that the name Batroumine is derived from "Bayt Roumine" in Arabic language, which means "The House of Roumine", while "Roumine" was a Roman princess who lived in this village more than 1500 years ago. Whether the origin of the word "Batroumine" is derived from Arabic or Syriac, they both rely on the old Byzantic and Modern Arabic heritage Batroumine has.

Ruins found under Batroumine 

Ruins of the old village were found under the modern Batroumine; around 40 stone houses connected with paved roads going back to the Byzantine era.
Archeological researches are ongoing to find more about Batroumine's history.

Notable people from Batroumine 
 Bishop Aghanatios Hraiki 1894 - 1969

Main families 
 Chikhani (or Shekhani) family
 Dayri (or Dayre) family
 Fakhoury (or Fakhouri) family
 Fayad family
 Ghanem family
 Hanna family
 Hraiki (or Hraiky) family
 Katrib (or Qatrib) family
 Koborssy (or Kobersi) family
 Lakkis (or Laqqis) family
 Mansour family
 Mlayyes (or Melayes) family
 Najjar (or Najar) family
 Daher family

References  

Eastern Orthodox Christian communities in Lebanon
Koura District
Populated places in Lebanon
Archaeological sites in Lebanon
Coloniae (Roman)
Roman sites in Lebanon